Émile Lecuirot (23 May 1907 – 28 January 1988) was a French rower. He competed at the 1928 Summer Olympics in Amsterdam with the men's coxless four where they were eliminated in the round one repêchage.

References

External links 
 
 

1907 births
1988 deaths
French male rowers
Olympic rowers of France
Rowers at the 1928 Summer Olympics
Sportspeople from Val-de-Marne
Rowers at the 1936 Summer Olympics
European Rowing Championships medalists